ISMAI - Instituto Universitário da Maia is an institute of higher education formed in 1990 in Maia, Portugal.

Academic first degrees:
Psychology
Psychosocial Counseling
Communication Sciences
Physical Education and Sports
Law (solicitors training)
Accountancy
Business Administration
Public Relations
Information Systems and Software
Human Resources Management
Technologies of Multimedia Communication
Health and Safety in Work
Telecommunication Networks
Management Informatics
Sports Management

Postgraduate degrees and Diplomas:

Doctoral Programmes:
Univ. of Salamanca (Spain) PhD degree in "Clinical Neuropsychology" in collaboration with ISMAI
Univ. of Vigo (Spain) PhD degree in "Fiscal Law"
Univ. of Vigo PhD degree in "Muiltimedia Communication"

MA/MSc programmes in:
Psychological Consultation, Counseling and Psychotherapy
Prevention and Treatment of Addicitions
Neuropsychological Evaluation and Intervention
Psychopathology of Language and Communication
Sexology
Physical Education
Communication in the Digital Era

See also
List of colleges and universities in Portugal
Higher education in Portugal

External links
Instituto Universitário da Maia

Higher education in Portugal
Maia, Portugal
Educational institutions established in 1990
1990 establishments in Portugal